The SJ Class Ma is an electric locomotive used by Swedish State Railways and later other railways. 41 units were built by ASEA between 1953 and 1960. It is derived from the older Mg-series, but unlike its predecessor it is used for freight and passenger trains. It is also the longest used loco in Sweden.

History
When the freight traffic on the Norrland lines was increasing towards the end of the 1940s, the need for more and stronger locomotives appeared. SJ decided to develop the Ma series based on the experience gained from the Mg series. Availability of more powerful motors made the locomotive capable of hauling heavy trains at 100 km/h, making the series quite flexible. Equipment was placed inside the locomotive, removing the noses and giving the Ma a very different appearance from the Mg series. ASEA delivered 32 locomotives to SJ, in addition to 9 to TGOJ. It was put into service on passenger and freight trains in Central and Northern Sweden.

When TGOJ got electric locomotives it also chose the Ma series. The nine locos were delivered from 1954 to 1958, and originally used on iron ore traffic between Ludvika and Oxelösund. They differ from the ones delivered to SJ with that they can be driven in multiple and have round instead of square side windows.

In the mid 1960s it was decided to modernize the Ma-series through rebuilding the drivers cabin and mounting new side windows, in addition to a number of technical improvements.

After the Rc locomotives were delivered in a large numbers to SJ in the early 1970s, the Ma series was restricted to freight only duties. This was despite being modernized at NOHAB in Trollhättan with changes to the bogies, main power switch, front lights and moving the cabin door to the centre to reduce noise. In 1991 SJ sold 25 of its 31 units to TGOJ, though they have not been used much. Two units are rented to BK Tåg while one has been sold to Inlandsgods.

In 2012, Green Cargo who had taken over TGOJ the year prior, decided to take the Ma-locomotives out of service. Most were scrapped, some were sold to heritage railways and other companies, and a few are still in service today.

External links
 Järnväg.net on Ma

ASEA locomotives
Ma
15 kV AC locomotives
Co′Co′ locomotives
Railway locomotives introduced in 1953
Standard gauge locomotives of Sweden
Co′Co′ electric locomotives of Europe